Self-Portrait with Bandaged Ear is an 1889 self-portrait by Dutch, Post-Impressionist  artist Vincent van Gogh. The painting is now in the collection of the Courtauld Institute of Art and on display in the Gallery at Somerset House.

Description 

In this self-portrait, Van Gogh is shown wearing a blue cap with black fur and a green overcoat, with a bandage covering his ear and extending under his chin. He is in a traditional three-quarter view, and his forward gaze falls slightly to the right, out of the frame. Behind him is an open window, assumedly letting in a winter breeze, a canvas on an easel, with a few indistinguishable marks, as well as a Japanese woodblock print. This woodblock print has been identified as a Geishas in a Landscape published by Sato Tokyo in the 1870s. This shows an important influence of Japonism and wood block print on Van Gogh's work, which also appear in the background of other portraits he had created. The painting is composed of impasto strokes, mostly in a vertical pattern. This creates a texture, which comes up off the canvas and adds dimension to the flat surface. The skin tone is muted with green and yellowish tones. The bandage covering Van Gogh's ear in this painting alludes to his most famous conflict. Van Gogh used a mirror for his self-portraits which is why some mistakenly think that he lost part of his right ear instead of his left.

The story 
Van Gogh moved from Paris to Arles in hopes of creating a community for artists to exist in mutual supportiveness and encouragement. He invited Paul Gauguin, an artist whom he had befriended in Paris, to come stay with him. They proved to be a disagreeable pair and quarreled often, sometimes violently. The evening of December 23, 1888 during one of their arguments, Van Gogh had a seizure during which he threatened Gauguin with a razor, but then injured himself, severing part of his left ear. In a state of excitement, he then brought the dismembered lobe to the Maison de Tolérance bordello where he presented it to a prostitute named Tiffany. When Gauguin returned the following morning he discovered that the police had arrived at the house, and blood was splattered in every room. Van Gogh had severed an artery in his neck, and was in grave health after losing so much blood. He was removed to the hospital, and he confessed to having no recollection of what happened during this fit. Throughout his life, Van Gogh continued to suffer from similar fits, sometimes characterized by acute paranoia.

Acquisition history
At the time of Van Gogh's death, this painting was in the possession of Julien (Père) Tanguy, although it was unclear how he had obtained it. Tanguy had posed twice for Van Gogh in 1887. It was exhibited in Paris 1901 and 1905 in a major Van Gogh retrospective. In 1928 Samuel Courtauld purchased it and it is currently located in the Courtauld Gallery in London.

Some critics dismiss this painting as a fake or crude pastiche. However, if this were true it would have been painted at a moment in the 1890s when it wouldn't have been profitable, as the artist would have died only a few years earlier and had only sold a handful of works in his lifetime. By January 17, 1889 Vincent had written to his brother Theo mentioning he had completed “another new self portrait.” Confusion has arisen over whether this was in reference to this work or to Self Portrait with Bandaged Ear and Pipe.   In each of these portraits Van Gogh is wearing the same clothing and sitting in the same pose, although the color schemes, props and locations are different. The Self Portrait with Bandaged Ear and Pipe has become more widely accepted in academia as one of Van Gogh's authentic paintings.

References

Self-portraits
Paintings by Vincent van Gogh
1889 paintings
Paintings in the collection of the Courtauld Institute of Art
Self-portraits by Vincent van Gogh